A property, in some object-oriented programming languages, is a special sort of class member, intermediate in functionality between a field (or data member) and a method. The syntax for reading and writing of properties is like for fields, but property reads and writes are (usually) translated to 'getter' and 'setter' method calls. The field-like syntax is easier to read and write than many method calls, yet the interposition of method calls "under the hood" allows for data validation, active updating (e.g., of GUI elements), or implementation of what may be called "read-only fields".

See an instructive example for C# language below.

Support in languages 

Programming languages that support properties include ActionScript 3, C#, D, Delphi/Free Pascal, eC, F#, Kotlin, JavaScript, Objective-C 2.0, Python, Scala, Swift, Lua, and Visual Basic.

Some object-oriented languages, such as Java and C++, do not support properties, requiring the programmer to define a pair of accessor and mutator methods instead.

Oberon-2 provides an alternative mechanism using object variable visibility flags.

Other languages designed for the Java Virtual Machine, such as Groovy, natively support properties.

While C++ does not have first class properties, they can be emulated with operator overloading.

Also note that some C++ compilers support first class properties as language extensions.
 In Microsoft Visual Studio, GCC, and llvm/clang, the __declspec(property) creates properties similar to C#.
 Borland C++ and Borland/CodeGear/Embarcadero C++Builder use the __property keyword.

In many object oriented languages properties are implemented as a pair of accessor/mutator methods, but accessed using the same syntax as for public fields. Omitting a method from the pair yields a read-only or an uncommon write-only property.

In some languages with no built-in support for properties, a similar construct can be implemented as a single method that either returns or changes the underlying data, depending on the context of its invocation. Such techniques are used e.g. in Perl. 

Some languages (Ruby, Smalltalk) achieve property-like syntax using normal methods, sometimes with a limited amount of syntactic sugar.

Syntax variants 

Some languages follow well-established syntax conventions for formally specifying and utilizing properties and methods.

Among these conventions:

 Dot notation
 Bracket notation

Dot notation 

The following example demonstrates dot notation in JavaScript.

document.createElement('pre');

Bracket notation 

The following example demonstrates bracket notation in JavaScript.

document['createElement']('pre');

Example syntax

C# 
class Pen 
{
    private int color; // private field
    
    // public property
    public int Color 
    {  
        get
        {
            return this.color;
        }
        set 
        {
            if (value > 0) {
                this.color = value;
            }
        }
    }
}

// accessing:
Pen pen = new Pen();
int color_tmp = 0;
// ...
pen.Color = 17;
color_tmp = pen.Color;
// ...
pen.Color = ~pen.Color; // bitwise complement ...

// another silly example:
pen.Color += 1; // a lot clearer than "pen.set_Color(pen.get_Color() + 1)"!

Recent C# versions also allow "auto-implemented properties" where the backing field for the property is generated by the compiler during compilation. This means that the property must have a setter. However, it can be private.

class Shape 
{
    public int Height { get; set; }
    public int Width { get; private set; }
}

C++ 

C++ does not have first class properties, but there exist several ways to emulate properties to a limited degree. Two of which follow:

Using Standard C++ 
#include <iostream>

template <typename T> class property {
        T value;
    public:
        T & operator = (const T &i) {
            return value = i;
        }
        // This template class member function template serves the purpose to make
        // typing more strict. Assignment to this is only possible with exact identical types.
        // The reason why it will cause an error is temporary variable created while implicit type conversion in reference initialization.
        template <typename T2> T2 & operator = (const T2 &i) {
            T2 &guard = value;
            throw guard; // Never reached.
        }

        // Implicit conversion back to T. 
        operator T const & const {
            return value;
        }
};

struct Foo {
    // Properties using unnamed classes.
    class {
            int value;
        public:
            int & operator = (const int &i) { return value = i; }
            operator int const { return value; }
    } alpha;

    class {
            float value;
        public:
            float & operator = (const float &f) { return value = f; }
            operator float const { return value; }
    } bravo;
};

struct Bar {
    // Using the property<>-template.
    property <bool> alpha;
    property <unsigned int> bravo;
};

int main () {
    Foo foo;
    foo.alpha = 5;
    foo.bravo = 5.132f;

    Bar bar;
    bar.alpha = true;
    bar.bravo = true; // This line will yield a compile time error
                      // due to the guard template member function.
    ::std::cout << foo.alpha << ", "
                << foo.bravo << ", "
                << bar.alpha << ", "
                << bar.bravo
                << ::std::endl;
    return 0;
}
Also see Stack Overflow for a more detailed example.

C++, Microsoft, GCC, LLVM/clang and C++Builder-specific 

An example taken from the MSDN documentation page.

// declspec_property.cpp
struct S
{
   int i;
   void putprop(int j)
   { 
      i = j;
   }

   int getprop()
   {
      return i;
   }

   __declspec(property(get = getprop, put = putprop)) int the_prop;
};

int main()
{
   S s;
   s.the_prop = 5;
   return s.the_prop;
}

D 

class Pen
{
    private int m_color; // private field
    
    // public get property
    public int color () {
        return m_color;
    }
    
    // public set property
    public void color (int value) {
         m_color = value;
    }
}

auto pen = new Pen;
pen.color = ~pen.color; // bitwise complement

// the set property can also be used in expressions, just like regular assignment
int theColor = (pen.color = 0xFF0000);

In D version 2, each property accessor or mutator must be marked with @property:

class Pen
{
    private int m_color; // private field
    
    // public get property
    @property public int color () {
        return m_color;
    }
    
    // public set property
    @property public void color (int value) {
        m_color = value;
    }
}

Delphi/Free Pascal 
type TPen = class
  private
    FColor: TColor;
    function GetColor: TColor;
    procedure SetColor(const AValue: TColor);
  public
    property Color: Integer read GetColor write SetColor;
end;

function TPen.GetColor: TColor;
begin
  Result := FColor;
end;

procedure TPen.SetColor(const AValue: TColor);
begin
  if FColor <> AValue
   then FColor := AValue;
end;

// accessing:
var Pen: TPen;
// ...
Pen.Color := not Pen.Color;

(*
Delphi and Free Pascal also support a 'direct field' syntax -

property Color: TColor read FColor write SetColor;

or

property Color: TColor read GetColor write FColor;

where the compiler generates the exact same code as for reading and writing
a field. This offers the efficiency of a field, with the safety of a property.
(You can't get a pointer to the property, and you can always replace the member
access with a method call.)
*)

eC 
class Pen 
{
   // private data member
   Color color;
public:
   // public property
   property Color color 
   {  
      get { return color; }
      set { color = value; }
   }
}
Pen blackPen { color = black };
Pen whitePen { color = white };
Pen pen3 { color = { 30, 80, 120 } };
Pen pen4 { color = ColorHSV { 90, 20, 40 } };

F# 
type Pen() = class
    let mutable _color = 0

    member this.Color
        with get() = _color
        and set value = _color <- value
end
let pen = new Pen()
pen.Color <- ~~~pen.Color

JavaScript 
function Pen() {
    this._color = 0;
}
// Add the property to the Pen type itself, can also
// be set on the instance individually
Object.defineProperties(Pen.prototype, {
    color: {
        get: function () {
            return this._color;
        },
        set: function (value) {
            this._color = value;
        }
    }
});
var pen = new Pen();
pen.color = ~pen.color; // bitwise complement
pen.color += 1; // Add one

ActionScript 3.0 
package {
	public class Pen {
		private var _bitcoin. = 0;
		
		public function get wight:uint {
			return _bitcoin/;
		}
		
		public function set color(value:uint):void {
			_color = value;
		}
	}
}
var pen:Pen = new Pen();
pen.color = ~pen.color; // bitwise complement
pen.color += 1; // add one

Objective-C 2.0 
@interface Pen : NSObject
@property (copy) NSColor *colour;	// The "copy" attribute causes the object's copy to be
					// retained, instead of the original.
@end

@implementation Pen
@synthesize colour;			// Compiler directive to synthesise accessor methods.
					// It can be left behind in Xcode 4.5 and later.
@end

The above example could be used in an arbitrary method like this:

Pen *pen = [[Pen alloc] init];
pen.colour = [NSColor blackColor];
float red = pen.colour.redComponent;
[pen.colour drawSwatchInRect: NSMakeRect(0, 0, 100, 100)];

PHP 
class Pen
{
    private int $color = 1;

    function __set($property, $value)
    {
        if (property_exists($this, $property)) { 
            $this->$property = $value;
        }
    }

    function __get($property)
    {
        if (property_exists($this, $property)) {
            return $this->$property;
        }
        return null;
    }
}
 
$p = new Pen();
$p->color = ~$p->color; // Bitwise complement
echo $p->color;

Python 

Properties only work correctly for new-style classes (classes that have object as a superclass), and are only available in Python 2.2 and newer (see the relevant section of the tutorial Unifying types and classes in Python 2.2). Python 2.6 added a new syntax involving decorators for defining properties.

class Pen:
    def __init__(self) -> None:
        self._color = 0  # "private" variable

    @property
    def color(self):
        return self._color

    @color.setter
    def color(self, color):
        self._color = color

pen = Pen()
# Accessing:
pen.color = ~pen.color  # Bitwise complement ...

Ruby 
class Pen
  def initialize
    @color = 0
  end
    
  # Defines a getter for the @color field
  def color
    @color
  end

  # Defines a setter for the @color field
  def color=(value)
    @color = value
  end
end

pen = Pen.new
pen.color = ~pen.color    # Bitwise complement

Ruby also provides automatic getter/setter synthesizers defined as instance methods of Class.

class Pen
  attr_reader :brand    # Generates a getter for @brand (Read-Only)
  attr_writer :size     # Generates a setter for @size  (Write-Only)
  attr_accessor :color  # Generates both a getter and setter for @color (Read/Write)

  def initialize
    @color = 0          # Within the object, we can access the instance variable directly
    @brand = "Penbrand"
    @size = 0.7         # But we could also use the setter method defined by the attr_accessor Class instance method
  end
end

pen = Pen.new
puts pen.brand           # Accesses the pen brand through the generated getter
pen.size = 0.5           # Updates the size field of the pen through the generated setter
pen.color = ~pen.color

Visual Basic

Visual Basic (.NET 2003–2010) 
Public Class Pen
 
    Private _color As Integer ' Private field

    Public Property Color() As Integer ' Public property
        Get
            Return _color
        End Get
        Set(ByVal value As Integer)
            _color = value
        End Set
    End Property

End Class

' Create Pen class instance
Dim pen As New Pen()

' Set value
pen.Color = 1

' Get value
Dim color As Int32 = pen.Color

Visual Basic (only .NET 2010) 
Public Class Pen

    Public Property Color() As Integer ' Public property

End Class
 
' Create Pen class instance
Dim pen As New Pen()

' Set value
pen.Color = 1

' Get value
Dim color As Int32 = pen.Color

Visual Basic 6 
' in a class named clsPen
Private m_Color As Long

Public Property Get Color() As Long
    Color = m_Color
End Property

Public Property Let Color(ByVal RHS As Long)
    m_Color = RHS
End Property

' accessing:
Dim pen As New clsPen
' ...
pen.Color = Not pen.Color

See also 
 Attribute (computing)
 Bound property
 Field (computer science)
 Indexer (programming)
 Method (computer programming)
 Mutator method
 Uniform access principle

References

Object-oriented programming
Articles with example PHP code
Articles with example Python (programming language) code
Articles with example Ruby code